Stephen Mitchell Samuels (1938, Brooklyn – July 26, 2012, Indiana) was a statistician and mathematician, known for his work on the secretary problem and for the Samuels Conjecture involving a Chebyshev-type inequality for sums of independent, non-negative random variables.

After completing his undergraduate degree at Massachusetts Institute of Technology, he became a graduate student at Stanford University. There he received his Ph.D. in 1964 with a thesis supervised by Samuel Karlin. Samuels joined in 1964 the faculty of Purdue University and retired there in 2003 as professor emeritus of statistics and mathematics. He did research on various topics in probability theory and its applications, dynamic optimization, and disclosure risk assessment for statistical microdata.

Selected publications
  1965
  1966
  1968
  1974
  1976
  1977
  1980
  1981
  1986
  1987
  1989
  1990
 
  1992

References

1938 births
2012 deaths
Probability theorists
20th-century American mathematicians
21st-century American mathematicians
American statisticians
Massachusetts Institute of Technology alumni
Stanford University alumni
Purdue University faculty